Yeongcheon Hwangbo clan is one of the Korean clans. Their Bon-gwan is in Yeongcheon, North Gyeongsang Province. According to the research held in 2015, the number of Yeongcheon Hwangbo clan’s member was 10001. Hwangbo clan in Korea began when Hwangbo gyeong was naturalized in Silla from Tang dynasty. Their founder was  who was a Hwangbo gyeong’s great-grandchild.  supported Taejo of Goryeo and made a contribution to the unification of three Koreas. He became four-star rank and Prince of Yeongcheon. Then he made Yeongcheon, Yeongcheon Hwangbo clan’s Bon-gwan and officially began Yeongcheon Hwangbo clan.

See also 
 Korean clan names of foreign origin

References

External links 
 

 
Korean clan names of Chinese origin
Hwangbo clans